Fat Freddy's Cat is a fictional orange Tabby cat, nominally belonging to Fat Freddy Freekowtski, one of the Fabulous Furry Freak Brothers, a trio featured in Gilbert Shelton's underground comix.

While the Cat is usually featured in a small 'topper' strip below a Freak Brothers strip, he has had independent appearances and storylines of his own. His two running jokes are Fat Freddy is too lazy to name him, and he suffers neglect and abuse from the Brothers' lifestyle.

History
Fat Freddy's Cat first appeared in 1969 in underground newspapers as a character in The Fabulous Furry Freak Brothers strip. He soon gained his own small spin-off topper strip, in imitation of the early Krazy Kat strips below The Family Upstairs by George Herriman. Some full-size stories also featured Fat Freddy's Cat.

Many of these strips have been collected in comic book form by Rip Off Press in a series of The Fabulous Furry Freak Brothers compilations and later The Adventures of Fat Freddy's Cat, which ran for four small size issues in the 1970s. Fat Freddy's Comics and Stories (one-shot, 1983) also included several stories about the Cat.

The Adventures of Fat Freddy's Cat were reprinted and expanded (starting over from #1) in six comic book size issues in the 1980s. They included new longer stories about the Cat. A seventh edition was released (in the US only) in 1993. After the demise of the underground newspaper, the Cat continued to appear in various comic books. His last appearance to date was in a 1990 strip reprinted in The Fabulous Furry Freak Brothers #12.

Character
The Cat is much smarter than Freddy, and while sharing many of his preoccupations such as drugs, food, sleep and sex, his stories also feature a fair amount of defecation. Like Garfield (whom he predates) he is laid back, but in his personal habits and outlook he is more like the Freak Brothers. However he tends to regard the Freak Brothers with amused contempt, frequently expressed by defecating in inappropriate and inconvenient places, such as stereo headphones.

Like Calvin of Calvin and Hobbes he has a fertile imagination. He is apt to tell tall stories to his three "nephews". One storyline features him playing the role of "F. Frederick Skitty", an undercover agent sworn to stop the distribution of "Tee Hee Hee", a drug that turns people into homosexuals. Another story involves a scheme by Fat Freddy to replicate Dick Whittington's success and sell the Cat to the (fictional) small, oil-rich nation of Pootweet to deal with mice.

In popular culture
The New Zealand band Fat Freddy's Drop, whose debut album won the 2005 Gilles Peterson Worldwide Winners Award, were named after the comic. The band's debut single had been recorded under the influence of LSD blotters that had been printed with images of Fat Freddy's Cat on them, and the band liked the name.

The popular 8-bit computer game Jet Set Willy has a room named "We Must Perform a Quirkafleeg" in honour of this strip.

Fat Freddy's Restaurant in Galway, Ireland, described as "Galway’s favourite restaurant", is extensively decked out with arcana and other memorabilia relating to the Fabulous Furry Freak Brothers and Fat Freddy's Cat.

The science fiction novel Scam Artists of the Galaxy (2020) contains a location named Fat Freddy's Restaurant with a supercilious mostly orange cat. This novel's sequel, Election Matters: Life on Universityworld (2022), sees the cat and one of its kittens appear.

In animation
Fat Freddy's Cat is voiced by Tiffany Haddish in the animated series The Freak Brothers, which debuted in 2020, and is commonly called Kitty by Fat Freddy. This version of the character is female and is capable of conversing directly with the Freaks whom she once again has a habit of insulting and belittling. She can apparently handle weed much better than them, though this did not prevent her from having the ultimate high that sent them from 1969 to 2020.

Bibliography

Cat stories longer than one page 
There have been more than a hundred small comic strips about the Cat, most of which have been reprinted in various formats, but there have only been eight stories longer than one page:
 "I Led Nine Lives!" (5 pages) — first appeared in The Fabulous Furry Freak Brothers #3 (Rip Off Press, 1973)
 "Chariot of the Globs" (6 pages) — first appeared in The Fabulous Furry Freak Brothers #4 (Rip Off Press, Nov. 1975)
 Untitled (2 pages) — first appeared in Fat Freddy's Cat #1 (Rip Off Press, Feb. 1977)
 "Animal Camp" (13 pages) — first appeared in The Fabulous Furry Freak Brothers #5 (Rip Off Press, May 1977)
 "The Burning of Hollywood" (6 pages) — first appeared in  Fat Freddy's Cat #4 (Rip Off Press, Aug. 1978)
 "The Sacred Sands of Pootweet" (9 pages) — first appeared in  Rip Off Comix #7 (Rip Off Press, 1980)
 "Paradise Revisited" (7 pages) — first appeared in Fat Freddy's Comics & Stories #1 (Rip Off Press, 1983)
 "The War of the Cockroaches" (27 pages) — first appeared in Fat Freddy's Cat #6 (Rip Off Press, 1986)

The Cat also appears as a key character in:
 "Frederick the Duck" (3 pages) — Fat Freddy's Comics & Stories #1 (Rip Off Press, 1983)

Solo titles and collections 
 The Collected Adventures of Fat Freddy's Cat and his Friends (Gilbert Shelton, 1975)
 The Adventures of Fat Freddy's Cat (Knockabout Comics, 1977)  - reprints the four small ''Adventures of ..." comix except for 4 strips from #2 and 1 strip from #3
 The Adventures of Fat Freddy's Cat (7 issues, Rip Off Press, 1977–1993)
 More Adventures of Fat Freddy's Cat (Rip Off Press, 1981)  — reprints 91 one-page strips
 Fat Freddy's Comics & Stories (2 issues, Rip Off Press, 1983–1985)
 The Fat Freddy's Cat Omnibus (Knockabout Comics, 2009)  — reprints The Adventures of Fat Freddy's Cat #1-7, The Fabulous Furry Freak Brothers #1-6

References

External links
 Rip Off Press, Inc., publishers of the Freak Brothers comics in the U.S.A.
 Knockabout Comics, publishers of the Freak Brothers comics in the U.K.
 Fat Freddys Cat LSD blotter art

American comics characters
Fictional cats
1969 comics debuts
Comics characters introduced in 1969
1990 comics endings
Comics spin-offs
Comics about cats
The Fabulous Furry Freak Brothers
Male characters in comics
Fictional characters without a name